The Heartland Messenger was a monthly watchdog newspaper based in Omaha, Nebraska. Publishers Ryan DeHarty and Mike DeLost created the Heartland Messenger as an alternative to existing newspapers. The Heartland Messenger had its first publication in January 2007 with a circulation of 10,000. Its purpose was to make the reader aware of issues that are of concern to many taxpaying citizens. It also offered finance and business columns, a senior citizen section, up-and-coming sport personalities, and other items of interest. The Heartland Messenger also published stories written and submitted by readers. 

The newspaper's apparent final issue was in April 2008, according to its now-defunct website.

References

External links
 Official Homepage

Defunct newspapers published in Nebraska
Independent newspapers published in the United States
Newspapers published in Omaha, Nebraska